The Saltmarsh Murders is a 1932 mystery detective novel by the British writer Gladys Mitchell. It is the fourth in her long-running series featuring the psychoanalyst and amateur detective Mrs Bradley. It has been highly acclaimed as a part of the Golden Age of Detective Fiction.

Synopsis
In the village of Saltmarsh the Vicar's maid is strangled not long after giving birth to an illegitimate child. Mrs Bradley, staying in the nearby manor house, leads the investigation. The killing opens the lid on a Pandora’s Box of vice in the small settlement.

References

Bibliography
 Miskimmin, Esme. 100 British Crime Writers. Springer Nature, 2020.
 Reilly, John M. Twentieth Century Crime & Mystery Writers. Springer, 2015.

1932 British novels
Novels by Gladys Mitchell
British crime novels
Novels set in England
British detective novels
Victor Gollancz Ltd books